Ein Nymphit (lit. Nymphit Spring) is a small nature reserve northwest of Tel Afek, south of Kfar Masaryk, Israel.

History
Ein Nymphit is named for a perennial spring that produces clean clear water. The water flows from the spring to Nahal Na'aman, filling some pools on the way. The spring is named for the Nymphaea caerulea that grows nearby.

The reserve is 62 dunams, declared in 1968.
Cyperus, Longleaf Pondweed flowers grow on the reserve, in addition to Nymphaea caerulea

See also
Geography of Israel
Wildlife of Israel

References

Nature reserves in Israel
Springs of Israel